{{Automatic taxobox
| image = Thyropygus navychula from Surin Islands.jpg
| image_caption = Thyropygus navychula from the Surin Islands
| taxon = Thyropygus
| authority=Pocock, 1894 
| display_parents = 3
| synonyms = * Cornugonus Demange, 1961
 Duplopisthus' Demange, 1961
 Spoliatogonus Demange, 1961
 Thyropisthus Attems, 1942
 Trigonostreptus Demange, 1961
}}Thyropygus is a genus of millipedes in the family Harpagophoridae, widely distributed throughout Southeast Asia.  It is the most-species rich genus of Harpagophoridae in Southeast Asia. Over 30 species occur in Thailand.

SpeciesMilliBase lists the following accepted species:
 Thyropygus acuminatus Silvestri, 1897
 Thyropygus allevatus (Karsch, 1881)
 Thyropygus amputus (Karsch, 1881)
 Thyropygus anurus Pocock, 1896
 Thyropygus aterrimus (Pocock, 1889)
 Thyropygus bearti Pimvichai, Enghoff & Panha, 2009
 Thyropygus bifurcus (Demange, 1986)
 Thyropygus bispinispatula Pimvichai, Enghoff & Panha, 2009
 Thyropygus bispinus Pimvichai, Enghoff & Panha, 2009
 Thyropygus boyoricus (Attems, 1903)
 Thyropygus brachyacanthus Pimvichai, Enghoff & Panha, 2009
 Thyropygus carli (Attems, 1938)
 Thyropygus casjeekeli Pimvichai, Enghoff & Panha, 2009
 Thyropygus chelatus Pimvichai, Enghoff & Panha, 2009
 Thyropygus cimi Pimvichai, Enghoff, Panha & Backeljau, 2016
 Thyropygus coelestis Silvestri, 1895
 Thyropygus confusus Attems, 1938
 Thyropygus convolutus (Demange, 1961)
 Thyropygus cristagalli Pimvichai, Enghoff & Panha, 2009
 Thyropygus cuisinieri Carl, 1917
 Thyropygus culter Pimvichai, Enghoff, Panha & Backeljau, 2016
 Thyropygus demangei Pimvichai, Enghoff & Panha, 2009
 Thyropygus dormiens Pimvichai, Enghoff & Panha, 2011
 Thyropygus dubius (Demange, 1961)
 Thyropygus elegans Silvestri, 1895
 Thyropygus enghoffi (Demange, 1989)
 Thyropygus erectus Pimvichai, Enghoff & Panha, 2009
 Thyropygus erythropleurus Pocock, 1894 - type species
 Thyropygus evansi (Demange, 1961)
 Thyropygus floweri (Demange, 1961)
 Thyropygus foliaceus (Demange, 1961)
 Thyropygus forceps Pimvichai, Enghoff, Panha & Backeljau, 2016
 Thyropygus globulus (Demange, 1989)
 Thyropygus hoffmani Demange, 1961
 Thyropygus immanis (Attems, 1903)
 Thyropygus implicatus (Demange, 1961)
 Thyropygus induratus Attems, 1936
 Thyropygus inflexus (Demange, 1989)
 Thyropygus intermedius Demange, 1983
 Thyropygus jarukchusri Pimvichai, Enghoff & Panha, 2011
 Thyropygus laterolobatus Pimvichai, Enghoff & Panha, 2011
 Thyropygus loxia Pimvichai, Enghoff & Panha, 2009
 Thyropygus luxuriosus Silvestri, 1895
 Thyropygus macrosiamensis Pimvichai, Enghoff & Panha, 2011
 Thyropygus mesocristatus Pimvichai, Enghoff, Panha & Backeljau, 2016
 Thyropygus microporus Attems, 1935
 Thyropygus navychula Pimvichai, Enghoff, Panha & Backeljau, 2016
 Thyropygus opinatus (Karsch, 1881)
 Thyropygus pachyurus Pocock, 1894
 Thyropygus peninsularis Hoffman, 1982
 Thyropygus perakensis (Pocock, 1892)
 Thyropygus planispina Pimvichai, Enghoff, Panha & Backeljau, 2016
 Thyropygus quadricuspis Pimvichai, Enghoff & Panha, 2009
 Thyropygus quietus Attems, 1938
 Thyropygus renschi Attems, 1930
 Thyropygus resimus Attems, 1938
 Thyropygus richardhoffmani Pimvichai, Enghoff & Panha, 2009
 Thyropygus rubrocinctus Pocock, 1894
 Thyropygus siamensis Verhoeff, 1938
 Thyropygus sutchariti Pimvichai, Enghoff, Panha & Backeljau, 2016
 Thyropygus uncinatus (Demange, 1961)
 Thyropygus undulatus Pimvichai, Enghoff, Panha & Backeljau, 2016
 Thyropygus ursus Pimvichai, Enghoff, Panha & Backeljau, 2016
 Thyropygus weberi Pocock, 1894
 Thyropygus weidneri'' Hoffman, 1982

References

Spirostreptida
Millipedes of Asia